From Jersey It Came! The Smithereens Anthology is a two-disc, career-spanning compilation album by the Smithereens, released in 2004. It features most of the band's singles, as well as album and EP tracks, non-album B-sides and a handful of rarities.

Overview
The album contains 39 songs spanning 1980 to 1999, and includes five previously unreleased tracks: a 1980 demo of "Elaine"; the surf rock instrumental, "Back to Balboa"; a 1987 live recording of "White Castle Blues"; an alternate mix of "Cut Flowers"; and a 1992 demo of "Love is Gone".

Also included are an alternate mix of "Everything I Have Is Blue", which was only released as a promotional single; two B-sides, "One After 909" and an instrumental mix of "If You Want the Sun to Shine"; and The Smithereens' version of "Downbound Train", originally recorded for the Bruce Springsteen tribute album, One Step Up/Two Steps Back: The Songs of Bruce Springsteen.

Track listing 
Adapted from the album's liner notes.

All tracks written by Pat DiNizio, except where noted.

Disc one
 "Girls About Town" — 2:53
from Girls About Town EP (1980)
 "Back to Balboa" (Jim Babjak, Dennis Diken, DiNizio, Mike Mesaros) — 1:58
previously unreleased; recorded summer 1982 at Rock Bite Studio, New York City
 "Much Too Much" (Diken, DiNizio)— 2:24
from Beauty and Sadness EP (1983); 1988 remix by Ed Stasium
 "Beauty and Sadness" — 3:24
from Beauty and Sadness EP (1983); 1988 remix by Ed Stasium
 "Blood and Roses" — 3:35
from Especially for You (1986)
 "Strangers When We Meet" — 3:45
from Especially for You (1986)
 "In a Lonely Place" — 4:04
from Especially for You (1986)
 "Behind the Wall of Sleep" — 3:24
from Especially for You (1986)
 "White Castle Blues" (Live) (Babjak, Robert Banta) — 7:42
previously unreleased; recorded live May 22, 1987 at The Stone Pony, Asbury Park, New Jersey; album version originally released as bonus track from Especially for You (1986)
 "Cigarette" — 2:27
from Especially for You (1986)
 "Crazy Mixed-Up Kid" — 2:07
from Especially for You (1986)
 "Time and Time Again" — 3:06
from Especially for You (1986)
 "Something New" — 1:56
from Green Thoughts (1988)
 "Only a Memory" — 3:43
from Green Thoughts (1988)
 "If the Sun Doesn't Shine" — 3:32
from Green Thoughts (1988)
 "Drown in My Own Tears" — 3:12
from Green Thoughts (1988)
 "Especially for You'" (Babjak, DiNizio) — 3:07
from Green Thoughts (1988)
 "House We Used to Live In" — 4:03
from Green Thoughts (1988)
 "Elaine" (1980 Demo) — 3:00
previously unreleased; recorded early 1980 at Odyssey Studio, Long Branch, New Jersey
 "Elaine" — 2:33
from Green Thoughts (1988)
 "One After 909" (John Lennon, Paul McCartney) — 3:36
B-side to "Top of the Pops" (1991); recorded during the Green Thoughts sessions, December 1987

Disc two
 "A Girl Like You" — 4:42
from 11 (1989)
 "Blues Before and After" — 3:15
from 11 (1989)
 "Blue Period" — 2:57
from 11 (1989)
 "Yesterday Girl" — 3:27
from 11 (1989)
 "Cut Flowers" (Honeys Mix) (Babjak, DiNizio) — 3:00
previously unreleased; alternate mix – album version from 11 (1989)
 "Baby Be Good" — 3:20
from 11 (1989)
 "Now and Then" (Babjak) — 3:50
from Blow Up (1991)
 "Too Much Passion" — 4:35
from Blow Up (1991)
 "Tell Me When Did Things Go So Wrong" — 2:22
from Blow Up (1991)
 "If You Want the Sun to Shine" (Instrumental) (DiNizio, Julian Lennon) — 5:50
B-side to "Too Much Passion" (1992); album version from Blow Up (1991)
 "Top of the Pops" — 4:32
from Blow Up (1991)
 "Evening Dress" — 3:12
from Blow Up (1991)
 "Miles from Nowhere" — 4:18
from A Date with The Smithereens (1994)
 "Love is Gone" (Babjak Studio Demo) (Babjak) — 3:38
previously unreleased; recorded December 1992 at Trax East Recording Studio, South River, New Jersey; album version from A Date with The Smithereens (1994)
 "Everything I Have Is Blue" (Guitar Mix) — 4:21
promotional single (1994); remix by Sean Slade and Paul Q. Kolderie; album version from A Date with The Smithereens (1994)
 "She's Got a Way" (Babjak, Diken, DiNizio, Mesaros, Danny Tate) — 3:24
from God Save The Smithereens (1999)
 "Downbound Train" (Bruce Springsteen) — 3:48
recorded 24 January 1997 at Chicago Recording Company, Chicago, Illinois; from One Step Up/Two Steps Back: The Songs of Bruce Springsteen (1997)
 "I Believe" (Babjak, Diken, DiNizio, Mesaros, Tate) — 3:12
from God Save The Smithereens (1999)

Personnel 
Credits adapted from the album's liner notes.
The Smithereens
Pat DiNizio – lead vocals, guitar
Jim Babjak – guitar, backing vocals, lead vocals (Disc one, track 9; disc two, track 14) 
Dennis Diken – drums, percussion, backing vocals
Mike Mesaros – bass, backing vocals

Additional musicians
Marshall Crenshaw – Hammond organ and piano (Disc one, track 6)
Jeffrey Berman – vibraphone (Disc one, track 7)
Frank Christian – acoustic guitar (Disc one, track 7)
Suzanne Vega – vocals (Disc one, track 7)
Joe Kernich – piano (Disc one, track 8)
Kenny Margolis – keyboards, piano, organ, accordion, harpsichord 
Don Dixon – piano, guitar, percussion, backing vocals
Marti Jones – backing vocals (Disc one, track 13)
Steve Berlin – saxophone (Disc one, track 17)
Maria Vidal – backing vocals (Disc two, track 1)
Michael Hamilton – guitar, keyboards, Mellotron
Belinda Carlisle – vocals (Disc two, track 3)
Gerri Sutyak – cello (Disc two, track 3)
Ed Stasium – backing vocals, percussion
The Honeys – backing vocals (Disc two, tracks 5, 6)
The Cowsills – backing vocals (Disc two, track 7)
Diana Graselli – backing vocals (Disc two, tracks 8, 11)
Alex Acuña – percussion (Disc two, track 8)
Sid Paige, Joel Derouin, Berj Garabedian, Michele Richards – violin (Disc two, track 8)
Larry Corbett, Suzie Katayama, Melissa Hasin – cello (Disc two, track 8)
David Campbell – String arrangements (Disc two, tracks 8, 10)
Kevin Savigar – keyboards (Disc two, track 10)
Maria Vidal – backing vocals (Disc two, track 11)
The Grip Weeds – backing vocals (Disc two, track 14)
Bill Maryniak – organ (Disc two, track 17)

Production personnel
The Smithereens – producer (Disc one, track 1; disc two, tracks 13, 15)
Andy Shernoff – producer (Disc one, track 2)
Alan Betrock – producer (Disc one, tracks 3, 4)
Don Dixon – producer (Disc one, tracks 5–8, 10–18, 20, 21; disc two, tracks 13, 15), liner notes
Ed Stasium – producer (Disc two, tracks 1–12)
Lou Giordano – associate producer (Disc two, tracks 13, 15)
Jim Babjak – producer (Disc two, track 14)
Don Fleming – producer (Disc two, tracks 16, 18)
Mike Mesaros – producer (Disc two, track 17)
David English – compilation producer
Dennis Diken – supervising producer, track annotations
Kevin Bartley – mastering
Diana Barnes – art direction
Bill Merryfield – design
Tim Gabor – illustrations  
Michael Halsband – photography
Deborah Feingold – photography

References

External links 
 From Jersey It Came! The Smithereens Anthology on Discogs.com. Retrieved on 9 February 2018.

The Smithereens albums
2004 compilation albums
Albums produced by Don Dixon (musician)